Pucciniastrum hydrangeae is a plant pathogen infecting hydrangeas.

References

External links

Fungal plant pathogens and diseases
Ornamental plant pathogens and diseases
Pucciniales
Fungi described in 1906